Skarvedalseggen  is a mountain in Innlandet county, Norway. The mountain peak lies along the border of Lesja and Skjåk municipalities.

See also
List of mountains of Norway

References

Mountains of Innlandet
Lesja
Skjåk